The women's 400 metres hurdles competition at the 2016 Summer Olympics in Rio de Janeiro, Brazil was held at the Olympic Stadium between 15 and 18 August.

Summary

The 2012 Olympic champion Natalya Antyukh could not have entered due to Russia's team doping ban. Of the medallists from the 2012 Olympics and 2015 World Championships only Czech athlete Zuzana Hejnová was present, though her form had been lacking that season. The three American medallists of that period did not qualify at the American trials, which were headed by Dalilah Muhammad in a world-leading 52.88 seconds. Top-four ranked Shamier Little and Georganne Moline were beaten by Ashley Spencer and 16-year-old Sydney McLaughlin there. Janieve Russell of Jamaica ranked third for the season but had fitness issues in preparation. Eilidh Doyle, Sara Slott Petersen and Wenda Nel were the only other entrants with times under 54.5 seconds that year.

In the final, Dalilah Muhammad went out aggressively, with a clear lead over the first hurdle. She made up the stagger on Sara Petersen to her outside before the end of the first turn.  When they hit the backstretch the positions revealed Peterson was clearly out second best. She continued to lead down the backstretch and through the turn, with Peterson trying to keep pace from behind with further to run around the turn. It is an all or nothing strategy, the only question is if she would tie up in the last 100. Muhammad had to stretch her strides to get over the eighth hurdle, a tip to Petersen that Muhammad might come back. Petersen made a run at Muhammad, perhaps achieving a slight gain between the ninth and tenth hurdle.  But Muhammad did not tie up, the gap didn't shrink and Muhammad had a clear victory. At the eight hurdle, two time world champion and the only returning medalist from 2012 Zuzana Hejnová and Janieve Russel were in a battle for bronze. Ashley Spencer and Eilidh Doyle were in a battle for dead last place, 3 metres behind the bronze medal battle. Over the last two hurdles, Russel faded, while Hejnová stayed about the same distance behind Petersen. But Spencer was in a different gear, running the last hundred like a 100-metre hurdler, passing three Jamaicans and Hejnová then continuing her rush, making a run at Petersen.

Petersen broke her own Danish National Record while winning silver.

The following evening the medals were presented by Nita Ambani, IOC member, India and Nawal El Moutawakel, Council Member of the IAAF.

Competition format
The women's 400 m hurdles competition had three rounds: a heats round with six races, three semi-finals, and a single final. The top three from each heat and the six fastest non-qualifiers progress to the semi-final stage. The top two of each semi-final and the two fastest non-qualifiers of that round compete in the final.

Records
Prior to the competition, the existing World and Olympic records were as follows.

The following national record was established during the competition:

Schedule
All times are Brasília Time (UTC−3)

Results

Heats
Qualification rule: first 3 of each heat (Q) plus the 6 fastest times (q) qualified.

Heat 1

Heat 2

Heat 3

Heat 4

Heat 5

Heat 6

Semifinals
Qualification rule: first 2 of each heat (Q) plus the 2 fastest times (q) qualified.

Semifinal 1

Semifinal 2

Semifinal 3

Final

References

Women's 400 hurdles
2016
2016 in women's athletics
Women's events at the 2016 Summer Olympics